King and the Dragonflies is a young adult novel from 2020 by Saint Thomian author Kacen Callender. The book was published in February 2020 by Scholastic Press.

Plot 
Kingston "King" James' brother, Khalid, has recently died, but King is convinced he has returned to him as a dragonfly. While mourning his loss, King has also broken things off with his best friend, Sandy Sanders, after Khalid (before he died) heard a rumor that Sandy was gay and didn't want King to be pegged as the same. However, Sandy disappears, but King finds him, and agrees to help him escape life with his abusive father.

Reception 
The book received positive reviews by Em Nordling at Tor.com, who said "For such a short novel, it packs a lot of punch, and never once feels rushed or didactic—it lets emotions be messy and lets characters be human," as well as calling the book "Riveting, emotionally real thing—as lived-in as a childhood bedroom, and incredibly kind and generous at its core." Elizabeth Bird, who reviewed the novel for the School Library Journal, said it was "the perfect balancing act." It won the National Book Award for Young People's Literature in 2020. A review on Common Sense Media called the book "lush and lyrical, a joy to read solely for the beauty of the sentences ... There are several sob-worthy passages, though ultimately this is a deeply hopeful and inspiring tale that will leave readers smiling, even if it's through happy tears." Callender compared the book to The Thing About Jellyfish and The Stars Beneath Our Feet.

References

2020 novels
National Book Award for Young People's Literature winning works
African-American young adult novels
Scholastic Corporation books